Ginsberg's theorem is a parody of the laws of thermodynamics in terms of a person playing a game. The quote was first attributed to the poet Allen Ginsberg in a 1975 issue of the Coevolution Quarterly

It is possible that the quote originates as a slight misstatement of the opening lines of "You Can't Win," by Charlie Smalls, as the copyright date for Small's song is 1974, earlier than the first attribution to Ginsberg. While the song was cut from 1975 Broadway debut of The Wiz, it was performed at the original 1974 Baltimore run of the musical.  Even earlier, the phrasing appeared in an issue of Astounding Science Fiction in 1956.

British scientist and author C. P. Snow is given credit by his students for using this to help learn the laws of thermodynamics in the 1950s.

Theorem 
The "theorem" is given as a restatement of the consequences of the zeroth, first, second, and third laws of thermodynamics, with regard to the usable energy of a closed system:

0. There is a game. (consequence of zeroth law of thermodynamics)
1. You can't win. (consequence of first law of thermodynamics)
2. You can't break even. (consequence of second law of thermodynamics)
3. You can't even get out of the game. (consequence of third law of thermodynamics)

It is sometimes stated as a general adage without specific reference to the laws of thermodynamics.

References

External links 

Laws of thermodynamics
Adages